The 2017 Bhopal–Ujjain Passenger train bombing was a terrorist attack that occurred on March 7, 2017 on the Bhopal–Ujjain Passenger, a passenger train which runs between Bhopal Junction railway station of Bhopal, the capital city of Madhya Pradesh and Ujjain Junction railway station.   The bombing occurred at Jabri railway station in the Shajapur district of Madhya Pradesh, injuring 10 passengers. It was stated to be the first-ever strike in India by the Islamic State. One of the terrorist suspect was later killed in an encounter in Lucknow. It was stated by the police that the module was self-radicalised and didn't receive any financial support from the group. Six persons were later arrested. National Investigation Agency (NIA) probe reports stated that the ISIS-inspired module had also conspired to bomb a rally of Prime Minister Narendra Modi.

On March 19, Indian authorities told the media that the terrorists related to this attack tried to flee India and go to Syria or Iraq.

See also  

 Jabri railway station
 List of rail accidents (2010–present)
 List of Indian rail incidents
 List of terrorist incidents in India
 List of terrorist incidents in March 2017

References

Terrorist incidents in India in 2017
Train bombings in Asia
ISIL terrorist incidents
Islamic terrorism in India
Islamic terrorist incidents in 2017
History of Madhya Pradesh (1947–present)
March 2017 crimes in Asia